Zuzana Šebová (born 1 April 1982) is a Slovak actress. She won the OTO Award for TV Female Actor in 2014 and 2015. She married Michal Kubovcik, a Slovak actor, in 2017.

Selected filmography 
Panelák (television, 2008)
Odsúdené (television, 2009)
 (television, 2009)
 (television, 2010)
 (television, 2012)
 (2014)
 (television, 2015)
 (television, 2015)

References

External links

1982 births
Living people
Slovak stage actresses
Slovak film actresses
Slovak television actresses
People from Žiar nad Hronom
21st-century Slovak actresses